Carlton Elliott (November 12, 1927 – July 18, 2005) was a defensive end in the National Football League.

Biography
Elliott was born Carlton Batt Elliott Jr. on November 12, 1927 in Laurel, Delaware.

Career
Elliott was drafted by the Green Bay Packers in the thirteenth round of the 1950 NFL Draft and played four seasons with the team. He played at the collegiate level at the University of Virginia.

See also
List of Green Bay Packers players

References

1927 births
2005 deaths
People from Laurel, Delaware
Green Bay Packers players
American football defensive ends
Virginia Cavaliers football players